Belle Prairie Township may refer to:
 Belle Prairie Township, Livingston County, Illinois
 Belle Prairie Township, Morrison County, Minnesota
 Belle Prairie Township, Fillmore County, Nebraska

Township name disambiguation pages